Lord Byron (1788–1824) was a British poet

Lord Byron may also refer to:
Lord Byron (umpire) (1872–1955), American Major League Baseball umpire 
Lord Byron (opera), a 1972 opera by Virgil Thomson  
Lord Byron (film), a 2011 Film by Zack Godshall 
 Anyone carrying the title Baron Byron